This is a listing of the horses that finished in either first, second, or third place and the number of starters in the Jennings Handicap, an American stakes race for horses three years old and older, at four different distances over the years (1-1/8 miles, 1-1/16 miles, 1 mile, and 6 furlongs),
on the dirt at Laurel Park Racecourse in Laurel, Maryland.  (List 1923–present)

A # indicates that the race was run in two divisions. This occurred in 1975 and 1977.

See also 

 Jennings Handicap
 Laurel Park Racecourse

References

Open middle distance horse races
Restricted stakes races in the United States
Laurel Park Racecourse
Horse races in Maryland
Recurring sporting events established in 1923